The Oshakati City, also known as FNB Oshakati City due to sponsorship reasons, is a Namibian football (soccer) club from Oshakati. They play in the country's second division, the Namibia First Division. Oshakati is based in Oshakati city in the northern part of the country, it was there for name after the original town Oshakati and most of the players are based from that town. The club has a huge sponsorship backing by First National Bank of Namibia and a local business tycoon Benjamen (Kagau-B.H) Hauwanga the owner of the BH Group of Companies operating in Namibia and Angola. The club colors are red and white.

The team have been relegated Namibia Premier League in season 2010/2011.

References

Football clubs in Namibia
Oshakati
1966 establishments in South West Africa